Jan Dresler (born March 12, 1983) is a Czech former professional ice hockey defenceman. 

Dresler played 466 games in the Czech Extraliga with HC Vítkovice, HC Plzeň, HC Slavia Praha and HC Karlovy Vary.

Dresler also played in the Tipsport Liga in Slovakia for MsHK Žilina and HK 36 Skalica.

Career statistics

References

External links 

1983 births
Living people
HC Berounští Medvědi players
Czech ice hockey defencemen
HC Havířov players
SHK Hodonín players
HC Karlovy Vary players
Orli Znojmo players
Piráti Chomutov players
HC Plzeň players
HK 36 Skalica players
HC Slavia Praha players
HC Slezan Opava players
Sportspeople from Ostrava
HC RT Torax Poruba players
HC Vítkovice players
MsHK Žilina players
Czech expatriate ice hockey players in Slovakia